Sucharit Bhakdi is a retired Thai-German microbiologist. In 2020 and 2021 Bhakdi became a prominent source of misinformation about the COVID-19 pandemic, claiming that the pandemic was "fake" and that COVID-19 vaccines were going to decimate the world's population.

He was a professor at the University of Mainz, where from 1991 to 2012 he was head of the Institute of Medical Microbiology and Hygiene. The university has disassociated itself from Bhakdi's views on the Coronavirus pandemic. In 2021 Bhakdi's publisher broke off relations following the appearance of an online video in which Bhakdi made antisemitic comments.

Early life and education 
Bhakdi was born Sucharit Punyaratabandhu, 1 November 1946, in Washington, D.C.; his parents are Thai diplomats. In an interview, Bhakdi stated that his mother studied at Johns Hopkins University in Baltimore.

Bhakdi studied at the Universities of Bonn, Gießen, Mainz and Copenhagen, and at the Max Planck Institute of Immunobiology in Freiburg.

He studied medicine at the University of Bonn from 1963 to 1970, during part of which (from 1966 to 1970) he was a scholarship holder of the German Academic Exchange Service. Bhakdi worked for a while as a private assistant to the internal medicine specialist . In February 1971 he received his doctorate in medicine. From 1972 to 1978, he studied at the Max Planck Institute for Immunobiology in Freiburg on scholarships from the Max Planck Society at the Max Planck Institute of Immunobiology in Freiburg and the Alexander von Humboldt Foundation.

He worked at the University of Copenhagen for a year before moving to the Institute of Medical Microbiology at the Justus Liebig University in Gießen, where he worked from 1977 to 1990. In July 1979 he habilitated.

Scientific and medical career
Bhakdi was appointed C2 professor at Gießen in 1982. He spent a further year in Copenhagen and became C3 professor of medical microbiology (at Gießen again) in 1987 before being appointed to the University of Mainz in 1990. From 1991 he headed the Institute of Medical Microbiology and Hygiene as a C4 professor.

Bhakdi retired on 1 April 2012. Since 2016 he has been a visiting scholar at the University of Kiel.

Bhakdi's criticisms of the COVID-19 pandemic response

His criticisms of states' (most particularly Germany's) reactions to the COVID-19 pandemic have included: 
	 
Writing an open Letter in March 2020 to German Chancellor Angela Merkel regarding the "socio-economic consequences of the drastic containment measures which are currently being applied in large parts of Europe"
Posting videos on YouTube claiming, for example, that the government was overreacting because the virus posed no more threat than influenza, and that any COVID-19 vaccine would be "pointless".
Participation in May 2020 in the writing of a "position paper of the BMI" by an employee of the German crisis management department. The Federal Ministry distanced itself from the position, calling the paper a "private opinion" circulating on official letterhead, and released the chief government councilor Stephan Kohn from duty.
He is the co-author of Corona, False Alarm? Facts and Figures (2020), German: ('Corona Fehlalarm?')  and Corona Unmasked. Neue Daten, Zahlen, Hintergründe. (Goldegg, Berlin/Wien 2021, . An earlier book of his was published in 2016, Schreckgespenst Infektionen – Mythen, Wahn und Wirklichkeit (tr. "Bogeyman Infections - Myths, Delusions and Reality") . He published these books together with his wife, a biologist and biochemist at the Quincke Research Center, Christian-Albrechts-Universität zu Kiel.
Describing Germany in December 2020 as a "health dictatorship", saying he wanted to emigrate to Thailand because of this.

Responses to Bhakdi's claims
Bhakdi's claims, in particular in his YouTube videos and in the book Corona Fehlalarm?, have been extensively fact-checked and found to be variously unsubstantiated, misleading, or false.

In Germany, fact-checking activity has included articles  at ZDF, the Austrian independent fact-checkers Mimikama, dpa, SWR3 and the German non-profit correctiv.org. In March 2020, ZDF said "His theses are unscientific, his numbers too low", Mimikama that his statements are "contrary to the scientific consensus of numerous experts, professors and colleagues and was described as largely dubious, unscientific and incorrect". Correctiv fact-checked one of Bhakdi's YouTube videos in June 2020, and found a number of problematic claims, including the claim that any COVID-19 vaccine would be "pointless", and that the virus posed no more threat than influenza.

On the basis of fact checks by Correctiv, ZDF, die Welt, Der Spiegel and Bayerischer Rundfunk, the Süddeutsche Zeitung summed up in April 2020: "What Wodarg and Bhakdi say is not completely wrong, but they mix facts with speculation and disinformation." Writing for Foreign Policy, in September 2020 Tyson Barker (Head of DGAP's Technology & Global Affairs Program) described Bhakdi as a prominent example from a "crop of debunked but credentialed so-called experts minting conspiracy theories and undermining fact-based information".

In October 2020 the University of Mainz issued a statement to the effect that it does not support Bhakdi's views.

Political activism, antisemitism
In 2021, Bhakdi was a founder of the new German political party dieBasis, which emerged out of the "Querdenken" political movement, standing as a candidate in the 2021 German federal election in North Rhine-Westphalia. In April 2021, the antisemitism commissioner for the state of Baden-Württemberg identified the Querdenken movement as providing space for antisemitic conspiracy theories, noting that Bhakdi singled out the German-Jewish minister of education in Schleswig-Holstein, Karin Prien, as "poisoning our children with CO2".

In a video released as part of his campaign, Bhakdi articulated antisemitic views, saying Israel is "even worse" than Nazi Germany, adding that "that’s the bad thing about Jews: They learn well...There is no people that learns better than they do. But they have now learned the evil — and implemented it. That is why Israel is now...a living hell". The Austrian publisher of three of Bhakdi’s books on the pandemic, said that it was severing ties with the author. Bhakdi was criticised by antisemitism commissioners for the states of Berlin and Baden-Württemberg.

Awards

Professional awards
 1979 Justus Liebig University Giessen Prize
 1980 Konstanz Medicine Prize
 1987 
 1988 Dr. Friedrich Sasse Prize
 1989 Ludwig Schunk Prize for Medicine
 1989 Robert-Koch-Förderpreis of Clausthal-Zellerfeld
 1991 Gay-Lussac Humboldt Prize
 2001 Aronson Prize for „wegweisende Arbeiten auf dem Gebiet des Komplementsystems und bakterieller Toxine“ tr. "pioneering work in the field of the complement system and bacterial toxins"
 2005 H. W. Hauss Award
 2005 Verdienstorden des Landes Rheinland-Pfalz
 2009 Rudolf-Schönheimer Medal of the

Negative award
Following the publicity accorded to Bhakdi's statements and publications regarding Covid-19 during 2020, the Gesellschaft zur wissenschaftlichen Untersuchung von Parawissenschaften (English: Society for the Scientific Investigation of Pseudosciences) named him as winner of the 2020 Goldenes Brett, awarded to Bhakdi as the "most astonishing pseudo-scientific nuisance" of the year.

References

1946 births
Living people

German medical researchers
Medical Microbiology and Immunology editors
Thai emigrants to Germany
Vaccine hesitancy